Vladimir Sobolev may refer to:

 Vladimir Sobolev (diplomat), Soviet diplomat and Ambassador to Belgium and Finland
 Vladimir Sobolev (geologist) (1908–1982), Soviet geologist
 Vladimir Yuryevich Sobolev (born 1991), Russian footballer